A referendum on the new constitution of France was held in Dahomey on 28 September 1958 as part of a wider referendum held across the French Union. The new constitution would see the country become part of the new French Community if accepted, or result in independence if rejected. It was approved by 97.84% of voters.

Results

References

Constitution
Dahomey
Dahomey
Referendums in Benin
Constitutional referendums